Alina Vladimirovna Artts (born 5 February 1986, Leningrad, Russian SFSR, USSR) is a Russian pop singer, television presenter, actress and writer. She is the chief editor of the television channel Europa plus tv. She hosts the morning channel "Novoye utro" on NTV. She also hosts the reality show M-1 Fighter in the Boyets television network the evening show Hot Secrets s Alina Artts, and the television programme Star Secrets, and sang "Olimpiyskiy tanets" the official song of the 2014 Winter Olympics torch relay.

Career

Russian television projects
Artts hosts a reality show on mixed martial arts M-1 Fighter on the Boyets television channel; 
She is also the host of the weekly programme Hot Secrets s Alina Artts on the music channel, from 2011 to 2013;
Artts hosted the programme Music Lunch live on Europa Plus TV in 2012;
She also hosted the programme Star Secrets s Alina Artts also on Europa Plus TV in 2013 and 2014;
Artts made a series of reports on Europa Plus Live in 2011, 2012 and 2013. Also for the TV network Europa Plus TV

International television projects
She hosted live broadcasts to the European audience of the Festival of Russian Song "Zielona Góra" from 2008 to 2013.
Artts lead a series of reports from the Billboard Music Awards Ceremony in 2012 and 2013
She also hosted Star Secrets—in which she interviewed international artists (such as Christina Aguilera, Tiësto, Fatboy Slim, Steve Aoki, Loverush UK, and Marlon Roudette) on Europa Plus TV.

Filmography

Music career
Artts was the vocalist of the DJ project Vengerov & Fedoroff from 2007 to 2008
She is the soloist of the group VIA Sirius from 2009 to 2010
Artts later started her solo vocal projects from 2011;
She is the performer of the official song of the Olympic torch relay "Olimpiyskiy tanets".

Olympic torch relay
The first performance of Artts' song "Olimpiyskiy tanets" was held on 8 October 2013 in Red Square. Since October 2013 her relay song crossed all countries, from the west to the east and back to Sochi, and performed "Olimpiyskiy tanets" at all official celebrations of the Torch Relay of the Olympic Flame, under which, thanks to the participation of hundreds of volunteers, it organized specially delivered flash mobs. October 28, 2013 Artts became an honorary torchbearer Torch Relay in the city of Pushkin.

Discography

Albums

Singles

Videography

References

External links
 
 

1986 births
Singers from Saint Petersburg
21st-century Russian singers
21st-century Russian actresses
Russian television presenters
Living people
21st-century Russian women singers
Russian women television presenters